Yordan Yordanov may refer to:

 Yordan Yordanov (footballer, born 1951), Bulgarian footballer
 Yordan Yordanov (canoeist) (born 1981), Bulgarian sprint canoer
 Yordan Yordanov (footballer, born 1992), Bulgarian footballer